Honduran Americans (or ) are Americans who trace their roots to Honduras, Honduran Americans belong to one or more of the follow ethnic groups such as mestizo, white, Lenca, Ladino people, Miskito people, Garifuna, and Creole peoples. The word is used to refer to someone born in the United States who is full or partial Honduran descendant  
The Honduran population at the 2010 Census was 837,694. Hondurans are the eighth largest Latino group in the United States and the third largest Central American population, after Salvadorans and Guatemalans. Hondurans are concentrated in Texas, Florida and California.

History

19th century 
The first Hondurans came to United States during the late 18th and early 19th centuries, by the time during Honduras was known as the Intendencia de Comayagua, later in 1820 changed its name to province of Comayagua in the Viceroyalty of New Spain, and later gained its independence from the Spanish Crown, founded as the republic of Honduras. It then for a short time became a part of the Mexican empire between 1822 and 1823, when the Empire started to collapse Honduras decided to become part of the Central American federation from 1823 to 1838.

20th century 

By the beginning of the century, Honduras and the United States had a closer relation, permitting U.S. and Honduran citizens move from one country to another due the fact of the banana companies, one Honduran American of this era was Steve Van Buren, born in the city of la Ceiba, that by the time had an economic growth. Despite dictatorships and wars, most Hondurans, which were mostly farmers and workers, had a stable way of life with few social changes until the mid and late 20th century when constant far-right coups started. All periods of conflict have led to minor waves of Honduran emigration to the United States. Such was the case after the 1956 military coup, however not very significant due the fact that in the 60s and 70s Honduras was one on the lowest crime rates countries in the globe, by only one criminal in between 100,000 people, so low and middle-class people in the big cities still had a safe and stable life.Hondurans immigrated to the United States in the 1960s, primarily to Miami, New York City, and Los Angeles. The main reason for Hondurans to leave their country during that decade was to escape poverty of the rural areas and to escape the military regimes that were against personal freedom in hopes of establishing a better life in the United States. Honduran migration as we know it started until the late 1980s when Honduras started an economic and political decline. Other minor Honduran migration was by the Jewish-Hondurans that left the country after the 2009 coup due to the rise of political tension.

Present-day 
Hondurans are one of the biggest Latino communities among Mexicans, Puerto Ricans, Dominicans, and Cubans. The metropolitan areas with most Honduran-Americans are Houston, New York City, Miami, Indiana, and Washington, D.C. Most of them had undertaken in business, such as the opening of coffee shops, others take advantage of their university studies to provide services to the American society. Many Hondurans migrated legally, many have joined undocumented Mexican migrants among other Central American people that cross Mexico, in 2018 came the migrant caravan. The caravan started due the Honduran political crisis and the electoral fraud of Juan Orlando Hernández, who was accused of corruption and political repression and the rise of drug cartels.

Causes 
Different historians, sociologists, and politologists have made different hypotheses for the cause of the Honduran migrations, some point to the institutional corruption, others point to the fact that Honduras is still controlled by a tiny oligarchy that has a monopoly on the country, others expressed that Honduras is the example of the failure of the neo-liberal model and the privatization of state owned industries. However, the most popular hypothesis involves the Honduran economic system and U.S. military interventions during the past decades.

Cold War roots 

Many analysts point out that one of the main, if not the main, factor in the current massive migration of Hondurans beginning in the late 80's early 90's was the United States military occupation in Honduras and its enormous influence on Honduras since the time of the Reagan's presidency. The 1980s were a period full of invasion and occupation of U.S. soldiers in Honduran soil during the Central American Crisis.

The United States under the Reagan administration government ordered hundreds of U.S. soldiers that were stationed at the nearby Palmerola Base during that period under the excuse of stopping socialism in Central America. It was another mission of the U.S. to wipe out any communism that was occurring in Honduras. President Reagan saw Honduras as a strategic point to grow U.S. influence in the Region. This event was key to the relationship between the U.S. and Honduras.

Ties to American companies 

Others point out that the start of migration of Hondurans is rooted in U.S. based banana and mining companies such as Standard Fruit Company and Rosario Mining Company. These companies in words of some analysts transformed Honduras in a kind U.S. colony similar to Cuba and Puerto Rico during the early 20th century and companies exploited many of their workers:

"American companies haved built new railroads and infraestructure in Honduras, but at the time established their own banking systems, bringed its own laws, and bribed government officials at a dizzying pace."

Much of the wealth that was accumulated in Honduras was carried off to New Orleans, New York City, and Boston. The conditions for Honduran workers worsened and much of the meanwhile Honduran lands were being owned by U.S. companies. As a result, many Hondurans felt isolated in their own countries:

"Honduran peasants had no hope of access to their nation's good soil".

Due to the fact that the U.S. dominated much of the wealth and labor in Honduras, this caused sentiments of resentment, isolation, and anxiety in the Honduran workers who made up most of the low class, as much of the native population had to deal with the reality of their economic situation. Many natives suffered when their private lands and properties were sold. Furthermore, the United States is one of the main reasons that led to a huge migration of Hondurans to the United States. Moreover, leading to the United States' most debated issues in the past decade: "illegal immigration". This era ended during the 1950s, after these Honduran workers made the "1954's strike" that ended with better conditions for the workers, freedom of expression, and better salary.

Many Honduran-Americans are sons and grandsons of farm laborers who first established themselves in the largest U.S. cities, in which they had support networks from the Honduran-American communities. In the late 1980s and 1990s, most Honduran Americans lived in New Orleans (50,000), New York City (33,000), Los Angeles (24,000), and Miami (18,000). In 2000, Hondurans grew to be the third largest immigrant group from Central America.

Contributions to American society

Arts 
Many Honduran Americans have contributed to the world of art, film, and television, such as Carlos Mencia or America Ferrera, and in fashion, providing Honduran cultural features in their designs. Many young Honduran-Americans study in art institutes various artistic disciplines.

Music 
They are two slopes of Honduran music, La Punta, of Afro-Caribbean origin, more originally from the Garifuna population, and marimba music, more connected to the mestizo-criollo identity of the country, however Honduras has its versions of other Latin genres such as salsa. Other Hondurans contributed to rock music, due the boom of rock in Honduras during the 80's and 90's.

Military service 
Honduran-Americans have actively participated in U.S. military service since World War II. Some of them have participated in North Africa allied operations, the Pacific War, and the occupation of Japan. A well-known story is the one of the Honduran U.S. soldier Luis Alemán Gomez that was part of the Allied occupation forces in Japan. A total of 13.7 percent of native (U.S.) Honduran-American males older than 16 years are in the military. Additionally, 769 Honduran-American non-citizen males serve in the military.

Socioeconomics 
Usually, Honduran-Americans live in areas with high economic growth and demand for employment in construction, domestic services, and other industries. Many Honduran-Americans suffer discrimination, as other Latino groups do especially Afro-Hondurans.

Honduran-American girls tend to spend more years in school than Honduran-Americans boys, in part due to pressure by their families on boys to start working at age 12 or 14. A total of 1,091 Honduran-Americans have a master's degree graduated in U.S. colleges, 862 have other professional degrees, and 151 have a doctoral degree. The majority of these individuals are women.

Demographics 
According to the 2010 United States Census there are 633,401 Hondurans living in the United States. By 2011, the number of Hondurans estimated to reside in the United States by the Census Bureau's American Community Survey was 702,000. In 2014, according to Pew Research, "60% of 573,000 Honduran immigrants in the U.S. are unauthorized".

Ethnic groups

Honduran Mestizos 

The most part of the Honduran-American people, a mix of Spaniard and Native people. These people came from different parts of Honduras. Most of them are located in large cities and have a high variety of social class, however most mestizo migrants are part of the middle and lower class of Honduras. Despite that, most of them finds economic success after migrating to the United States. Also, many Honduran Mestizos have a very diverse ancestry, not only Spanish and indigenous descent.

Indigenous Hondurans 

The indigenous people of Honduras are perhaps one of the most affected by all, since the time of the Spanish colony, the natives were at a disadvantage, therefore they are the people with the least voice and vote in their country. However, people of Lenca and Maya descent have moved to the United States mostly escaping unequal treatment by the Honduran authorities.

White-Honduran 

This is one of the minorities of Honduran migrants, mostly made up of Hondurans with European (Spanish, Italian, and German), Arab (Palestinan, Lebanese, Syrian), and Jewish descent. Due the fact that most whites in Hondurans are part of the middle and upper class most of white-Hondurans came legally to the United States. However, many Whites in the rural area of Honduras also suffer the economic inequality of their country and decide to move to the U.S.

Afro-Honduran

Garifuna
Part of the minorities of Hondurans, most Afro Honduran-American belong to the Garifuna ethnic group and the black Caribs still on the Bay Islands. They are primarily descended from a group transported to the Bay Islands by the British from St. Vincent after an insurrection. Due to their location, the north coast of Honduras, most of them are fluently in English, most Afro-Hondurans stand out in the musical and sports field. Garifuna speak their native language and Spanish as their primary language.

British Caribbean
The Bay Islands were colonized by the British who besides the Garifuna brought laborers and attracted fishermen from older colonies like the Caymans and Jamaica. Most of these people brought by the British were of African descent. The development of the banana industry by United Fruit which resulted from the merger of banana companies one of which had begun in Jamaica resulted in further migration to the Honduran coast.

Notable people

 Luis Calix - Soccer Player
 Alessandro Castro - Soccer Player
 Renán Almendárez Coello -radio show host of the show El Cucuy de la Mañana
 Teofilo Colon Jr. - Photographer, filmmaker, writer, and journalist 
 Ronnie Aguilar - Basketball Player
 David Archuleta – runner-up of American Idol Season 7
 Michael Benjamin (investor) – private investor focusing on Internet companies. He was a Republican candidate for the United States Senate in 2004.
 Steve Van Buren – NFL Hall of Fame Running Back (Philadelphia Eagles)
 Bianca Del Rio – actor, comedian, costume designer, and drag queen.
 Brandon Escobar – wrestler
 Empress Of - Singer
 Roger Espinoza – soccer player who currently plays for Sporting Kansas City in Major League Soccer.
 Miguel Estrada – attorney who became embroiled in controversy following his 2001 nomination by President George W. Bush to the United States Court of Appeals for the District of Columbia Circuit. He was the first Latino to be nominated to a high position in the judicial branch and would have been a potential Supreme Court nominee.
 Kat Fajardo - Author
 America Ferrera – film actress (Real Women Have Curves, The Sisterhood of the Traveling Pants, Ugly Betty)
 Michelle Fields – political journalist, Huffington Post contributor
 Brian Flores – former Head Coach for the Miami Dolphins
 Henry Flores – professional American photographer who addresses modern pop culture
 Samuel Gómez - Soccer Player
 Illich Guardiola – American actor
 Ali Hall - Soccer Player
 Teófimo López – Professional boxer, world lightweight champion since 2020
 Dewan Hernandez - Basketball Player
 Maximiliano Hernández – film actor (Captain America: The Winter Soldier, Sicario, The Last Ship)
 Maity Interiano – journalist, entertainment reporter and television producer 
 Skai Jackson – actress 
 Karrie Martin - Entrepreneur 
 Walmer Martinez - Soccer Player
 Annia Mejia - Soccer Player
 Virginia "Ginny" Montes (1943–1994) – civil rights activist and feminist
 Rigo Nova – actor born in Honduras and co-founder of "Light for Honduras".  His background is Engineering and Information Technology.
 Juan Carlos Obregón Jr. - Soccer Player
 Brina Palencia – voice actress, ADR director, and singer primarily known for her work for Funimation Entertainment/OkraTron 5000.
 Satcha Pretto – journalist and TV news presenter
 Francia Raisa – actress
 Taxstone – television and podcast personality
 Andres Serrano – photographer and artist who has become notorious through his photos of corpses and his use of feces and bodily fluids in his work. He is of Honduran and Afro-American descent.
 Hype Williams – Billboard and MTV VMA award-winning music video and film director.
 Gerald Young – former Major League Baseball outfielder
 Daniel Zacapa – film actor (The Mexican, Seven, Odd Couple II, Confessions of a Dangerous Mind)
 José Zúñiga – film actor (24, Prison Break, The O.C)
 Sauce Walka - Rapper

See also

Honduras–United States relations
Hondurans in New Orleans
History of Central Americans in Los Angeles

References

Further reading
 Maxwell, William. "Honduran Americans." Gale Encyclopedia of Multicultural America, edited by Thomas Riggs, (3rd ed., vol. 2, Gale, 2014), pp. 345–355. online

 
Hispanic and Latino American